The Lithuanian Air Force Band is a Lithuanian musical group representing the Lithuanian Air Force which participates in military parades, celebrations, funeral ceremonies, as well as concerts for the public. It was founded in Vilnius on 12 May 1994 as two separate orchestras (the central air force orchestra led by Colonel Č. Braziulis, and the Vytautas Magnus Battalion wind orchestra led by Colonel J. Veselkos). On 21 March 2001, the Commander of the Air Force and the Minister of National Defense ordered the merger of the two orchestras to become the representative air force orchestra. The orchestra has 29 musicians and is led by Captain Ričardas Kukulskis and Captain Remigijus Terminas.

See also 

 Lithuanian Armed Forces Orchestra
 Military Music Center of the Ukrainian Air Force
 Air Force Band Erfurt

References

External links
 A concert of the orchestra

Lithuanian military bands
Lithuanian musical groups
Musical groups established in 1994
1994 establishments in Lithuania
Air force bands